William Durham is an Australian former professional tennis player. He was a junior doubles champion at the 1972 Australian Open.

Durham reached a career high ranking of 202 while competing on the professional tour and made regular Australian Open appearance in the 1970s. He also qualified for the main draw of the 1973 Wimbledon Championships, where he had a first round win over Soviet Davis Cup player Sergei Likhachev, before losing his next match in five sets to Russell Simpson.

References

External links
 
 

Year of birth missing (living people)
Living people
Australian male tennis players
Grand Slam (tennis) champions in boys' doubles
Australian Open (tennis) junior champions
20th-century Australian people